My Super Psycho Sweet 16 is a 2009 American made-for-TV slasher film, based on the MTV show, My Super Sweet 16. The film follows two girls: outcast Skye Rotter (Lauren McKnight), and the spoiled Madison Penrose (Julianna Guill) who hosts her sweet sixteen at an abandoned roller skating rink, where a masked killer begins murdering the party patrons.

Plot

Madison Penrose is preparing for her Sweet 16. She wants to have her party at the Roller Dome, a once-popular roller skating rink with a violent history. A flashback reveals that Charlie Rotter, who was the owner and entertainer of the Roller Dome, had dismembered and stuffed six teens into oil bins before finally being turned into the police by his 6-year-old daughter Skye. While being transported to prison, the van crashes and Charlie is believed to have died.

Ten years later, Skye is now an outcast and shunned by her classmates because of her father's crimes. One morning she has a flirtatious moment with Madison's ex-boyfriend, Brigg, which is witnessed by Olivia, one of Madison's best friends. Olivia immediately rushes to tell Madison and finds her with their other best friend, Chloe. After learning what's happened between Sky and Brigg, Madison decides that Skye needs to be punished. Later that same day after swim class, Skye arrives at her gym locker to see that it's covered with paint and her clothes are cut up. Madison's friend Lilly arrives and tells Skye who was responsible, then admits that she actually dislikes Madison and encourages Skye to try and get revenge. Skye refuses and tries to leave but is stopped by Madison, who harasses her. Afterwards, Skye walks home and Brigg sees her while driving by. He reverses back to offer a ride, which Skye reluctantly accepts. During the drive, Brigg asks Skye to hang out Saturday night and she accepts. The next morning at school, Madison hands out invitations to her Sweet 16 and invites Brigg, which interferes with his plans with Skye. While hanging out after school, Skye's best friend Derek says he wants to sneak into Madison's party and she should join him. Skye initially refuses since it's where her father committed his crimes. Brigg then arrives and explains to Skye why he's going to the party and says he will make it up to her. Not believing him, she tries to break things off with Brigg, but he kisses her and says that he really does want to spend more time together, just on a different day. When he leaves, Skye decides that she's going to crash Madison's party.

Skye texts Lilly for help and she leaves a backdoor unlocked for Skye and Derek to sneak in. Skye's father is revealed to be alive and he spends a majority of the party stalking and killing the guests. When Madison's father starts giving a birthday speech, Olivia goes to use the bathroom and finds Chloe's dead body in the stall next to her. She tries to roll out to the crowd but Charlie appears and cuts her head off. Frightened, everyone leaves except for Madison and Skye. Madison blames Skye for everything and starts getting physical with her when Charlie appears, locking the front exit. They try to run out the back but their path is blocked by the gutted party planner. Charlie then  attacks Madison, but she and Skye are able to get away and reunite with Brigg. Charlie reappears and chases the three of them to the edge of a balcony. Derek uses the DJ booth to flash spotlights in Charlie's face, distracting him long enough for Skye and Madison to escape. Brigg tries to fight with Charlie but is quickly thrown off the balcony. Believing he is dead, the rest try to run to the exit but are unsuccessful. Charlie catches up to them and knocks out Madison, then starts strangling Derek. Skye begs her father to spare him, so Charlie tosses him outside then re-locks the doors.

Madison wakes up in the basement with Skye, both their hands tied to a table. Charlie then unties Skye, gives her a knife and tells her to kill Madison. Skye initially pretends to comply but decides to stab Charlie instead, then uses a cabinet to pin him to the ground. Skye rushes to free Madison but struggles with the ropes. Losing patience, Madison begins insulting Skye and continues to blame her for the deaths at the party. Once untied, Madison shoves Skye to the ground so she can get to the exit first, but Charlie reaches out and grabs Madison's leg. While she's struggling with Charlie, Skye rushes to the exit and hesitates to leave. When Madison frees herself, Skye decides to close the gate and lock her inside with Charlie. Skye goes back upstairs and sees police enter the building, telling them where her father is before leaving. She runs into Derek outside, but ignores him and steals Madison's new car. The police arrive in the basement and discover Madison dead and Charlie missing.

A few days later, Brigg wakes up late one night in the hospital. Skye arrives and brutally stabs him to death. Brigg frantically awakens and realizes he was having a nightmare. He asks the nurse where Skye is but she tells him no one has seen her. The nurse leaves the room and Brigg turns over on his side, seeing Skye visited him at some point and left a drawing of hers on the table next to him.

Cast
 Julianna Guill as Madison Penrose
 Lauren McKnight as Skye Rotter
 Lauren Eichner as Young Skye
 Chris Zylka as Brigg
 Matt Angel as Derek
 Alex Van as Charlie Rotter
 Maia Osman as Olivia 
 Susan Griffith as Chloe 
 Joey Nappo as Kevin 
 Leandra Terrazzano as Lilly 
 Ric Reitz as Mr. Penrose
 Kathleen Batson as Mrs. Penrose
 Shannon Eubanks as Aunt Sarah
 Chad McKnight as Party Planner
 Damien Haas as Craig
 Brytni Lavender as Karen

Production
Director Jacob Gentry worked on the film with his long-time friend Alex Motlagh. Gentry was not a fan of reality shows, figuring they are "the lowest form of entertainment you have". However, once he started watching My Super Sweet 16, the reality series the producers had wanted to base the film on, he had a realization that it is the perfect scenario for a horror film. Gentry went on to say he was aware that the film "is clearly in the "slasher genre" where there are rules viewers expect will be followed. It's like playing the blues, you want to give it your spin but you don't want to interrupt the formula too much. You still have to play the blues. In this case, we don't want to reinvent the wheel".

Filming took place in Atlanta, where Gentry and Motlagh grew up. The film never mentions Atlanta, but does show the city's skyline at the very end. Gentry told Radio and TV Talk: "There are things shown that makes it clear it's Atlanta if you know Atlanta". One of the characters, Madison, also makes reference to flying a stylist in 3,000 miles from Los Angeles, making it evident that the film is set somewhere on the East Coast. Gentry added: "We [also] wanted to make it every city, not too region specific. We wanted it to connect with anyone". The high school scenes were mostly filmed at Henry W. Grady High School, including the library, locker room and gym. Shots were also filmed at Sprayberry High School. All of the minor actors lived in Atlanta, making casting much easier. Thousands of actresses auditioned for the role of Madison Penrose, according to casting directors, but Julianna Guill seemed "perfect for the role".

Soundtrack
The songs below were all featured in the film:

Critical reception
The film was generally well received by audiences. It delivered the network's strongest rating in the time period in over a year and a half. Among female teens, the film ranked #1 in its time period versus all ad-supported TV competition, and #2 overall across all television competition, behind only Disney. Scott Foy of Dread Central rated it 2.5 stars and wrote: "Too much of My Super Psycho Sweet 16 is just a regurgitating of teen movie clichés with the emphasis more on the romantic triangle and teen bullying side of the plot than the masked psychopath randomly hacking and slashing party patrons".

Unrated version
Airings on MTV are slightly edited; iTunes and DVD releases are uncut, featuring a bit more gore. Edited scenes include Craig's death, showing the pool stick impaling him; the party-planner's corpse in the chase scene is shown longer; and Brigg's dream in the end is longer.

Home release
My Super Psycho Sweet 16 was released on DVD on October 18, 2010, to coincide with the premiere of the sequel a week later on October 22. It is the unrated version and contains no special features. It is available to buy on Amazon.com and to download on the iTunes Store. Due to several complaints about the DVD just being a burnt copy of the film, Paramount Home Entertainment announced a Blu-ray Combo Pack edition, but no official release date has been set.

Sequels
The film was followed by two sequels, My Super Psycho Sweet 16: Part 2 (2010) and My Super Psycho Sweet 16: Part 3 (2012).

References

External links

 
 

My Super Psycho Sweet 16
2009 television films
2009 films
American teen horror films
American comedy horror films
Films shot in Atlanta
Films set in 1999
Films set in 2009
Films about birthdays
American serial killer films
American slasher films
Roller skating films
MTV original films
Paramount Pictures direct-to-video films
2000s teen horror films
American comedy television films
American horror television films
2000s English-language films
2000s American films